Chang Feiya (born 3 February 1993 in Linquan) is a Chinese football player who currently plays for Chinese Super League side Guangzhou R&F.

Club career
Chang started his professional football career in 2011 when he was promoted to Guangdong Youth's squad for the 2011 China League Two campaign. He joined Chinese Super League side Guangzhou R&F in 2013. With high praise of team manager Sven-Göran Eriksson, he was promoted to the first team in December 2013. On 16 March 2014, he made his Super League debut in a goalless draw against Liaoning Whowin, coming on as a substitute for Abderrazak Hamdallah in the 81st minute. He scored his first Super League goal on 26 April 2015, which ensured Guangzhou R&F beat Changchun Yatai 2–1. 

In February 2017, Chang extended his contract with the club until the end of 2019 and was loaned to Super League newcomer Guizhou Zhicheng for one season. He made his debut for Guizhou on 3 March 2017 in a 1–1 home draw against Liaoning FC, coming on as a substitute for Ilhamjan Iminjan in the 66th minute. On 26 February 2019, Chang was loaned out against to the Super League newcomer Wuhan Zall for the 2019 season.

Career statistics 
Statistics accurate as of match played 31 December 2021.

References

External links
 

1993 births
Living people
Chinese footballers
People from Fuyang
Footballers from Anhui
Guangzhou City F.C. players
Guizhou F.C. players
Wuhan F.C. players
Association football forwards
Chinese Super League players
China League Two players
Footballers at the 2014 Asian Games
Asian Games competitors for China